The Little Emory River rises in Morgan County, Tennessee near the town of Coalfield.  It is one of the major tributaries to the Emory River.  It crosses into Roane County, where it soon becomes an embayment of Watts Bar Lake several miles upstream of its mouth into the Emory.  (Watts Bar Lake is a relatively deep  reservoir  and causes "slack water" conditions many miles up several Tennessee River tributaries, not just the main stream.)

See also
List of rivers of Tennessee

References

Rivers of Tennessee
Rivers of Morgan County, Tennessee
Rivers of Roane County, Tennessee